"Liberate the South" was the national anthem of the Provisional Revolutionary Government of the Republic of South Vietnam from 1969 to 1976.

The anthem was composed by the famous trio Lưu Hữu Phước, Mai Văn Bộ and Huỳnh Văn Tiểng under the common pseudonym Huỳnh Minh Siêng.

History
After the establishment of National Liberation Front of South Vietnam in December 1960, the Front leaders proceeded to make a song as its official anthem. This mission is assigned to the three writers of the famous trio Hoàng - Mai - Lưu: Lưu Hữu Phước, Mai Văn Bộ, and Huỳnh Văn Tiểng.

Phạm Hùng, Secretary of the Central Office of South Vietnam (COSVN), outlined the requirements about the ordered anthem:

The anthem's targets were all of the population of South Vietnam.
The anthem had to call for the armed insurrection against the US-backed Saigon regime and the unification of Vietnam as a whole.
The authors had to use a novel pseudonym to maintain the independence of the National Liberation Front of South Vietnam.
The song had to be easy to remember, sing, perform and popularize.

Mai Văn Bộ and Huỳnh Văn Tiểng wrote the lyrics and Lưu Hữu Phước composed the music. The trio decided to use a new pseudonym "Huỳnh Minh Liêng", with the letter H, M, L representing the family name of each member. However, the printing houses mistook the word "L" for "S", hence the pseudonym was mistakenly published as "Huỳnh Minh Siêng". The author trio decided to left the misspelled pseudonym as it is because "Siêng" (meaning "diligent") was considered to be a good name.

The anthem received positive feedback from the local members and the central body of the National Liberation Front of South Vietnam. COSVN Secretary Phạm Hùng was very satisfied with the song's quality; when the song was tested for the first time he jubilantly stood up and said: "Great job! Very good song! Congratulation and thanks, comrades!".

Lyrics

Vietnamese lyrics
Giải phóng miền Nam, chúng ta cùng quyết tiến bước.
Diệt Đế quốc Mỹ, phá tan bè lũ bán nước.
Ôi xương tan máu rơi, lòng hận thù ngất trời.
Sông núi bao nhiêu năm cắt rời.
Đây Cửu Long hùng tráng. Đây Trường Sơn vinh quang.
Thúc giục đoàn ta xung phong đi giết thù.
Vai sát vai chung một bóng cờ.

Vùng lên! Nhân dân miền Nam anh hùng!
Vùng lên! Xông pha vượt qua bão bùng.
Thề cứu lấy nước nhà! Thề hy sinh đến cùng!
Cầm gươm, ôm súng, xông tới!
Vận nước đã đến rồi. Bình minh chiếu khắp nơi.
Nguyện xây non nước sáng tươi muôn đời.

English translation
To liberate the South, we decided to advance,
To exterminate the American imperialists, and destroy the country sellers.
Oh bones have broken, blood has fallen, the hatred is rising high.
Our river and mountain has been separated for so long.
Here, the sacred Mekong. Here, the glorious Truong Son
Are urging us to advance to kill the enemy,
Shoulder to shoulder, under a common flag!

Arise! Oh you brave people of the South!
Arise! Together through the storm.
Swear to save the homeland! Swear to sacrifice to the end!
Hold the sword and hug the gun, go forward!
The country's fate has come. Dawn shines everywhere.
Wish to build our young country forever shining.

See also
 National anthem of South Vietnam
 Vietnam
 Vietnam War
 South Vietnam
 North Vietnam
 National anthem of Vietnam

References

External links
Liberate the South at NationalAnthems.info

Vietnamese symbols by subdivision
Historical national anthems
South Vietnam
North Vietnam
Vietnamese songs
National symbols of Vietnam
Songs of the Vietnam War
Songs about Vietnam
Asian anthems